Zao Dam is a small earth core rock-fill dam in Khyber Agency of FATA, Pakistan.

The construction of dam was started in July, 2011 and completed in June, 2014 at a cost of PKR 142 million. The dam has a height of 85 feet, covered a length of around 270 feet, with actual storage capacity of water 800 acre feet. The dam irrigates around 250 acres of area.

See also
 List of dams and reservoirs in Pakistan

References

Dams in Pakistan
Buildings and structures in Khyber Pakhtunkhwa
Dams completed in 2014
2014 establishments in Pakistan
Rock-filled dams
Dams in Khyber Pakhtunkhwa